This is a summary of the electoral history of Michael Portillo, who was a prominent Conservative Party politician who served as a cabinet minister under John Major and was an MP from 1984 to 1997 and again from 1999 to 2005.

1983 General Election, Birmingham Perry Barr

By-Election 1984, Enfield Southgate

1987 General Election, Enfield Southgate

1992 General Election, Enfield Southgate

1997 General Election, Enfield Southgate

By-Election 1999, Kensington and Chelsea

2001 General Election, Kensington and Chelsea

Portillo
Portillo, Michael
Portillo, Michael